Neochlamisus bimaculatus is a small leaf beetle (Coleoptera: Chrysomelidae) that belongs to the group of casebearers called Camptosomata.  They mate, feed, and oviposit on their host plant Rubus spp., which includes blackberry.

References

Cryptocephalinae
Beetles described in 1972